Sphingomonas aurantiaca  is a Gram-negative and psychrotolerant bacteria from the genus of Sphingomonas which has been isolated from indoor dusts from animal sheds in Finland.

References

Further reading

External links
Type strain of Sphingomonas aurantiaca at BacDive -  the Bacterial Diversity Metadatabase

aurantiaca
Bacteria described in 2003